Prigorodny is a rural locality (a settlement) in Frolovsky District of Volgograd Oblast, Russia. Prigorodny serves as an administrative center of Frolovsky Municipal District. Population:

References

Notes

Sources

Rural localities in Frolovsky District